The City municipality of Kostolac ( is a town in Serbia and one of two city municipalities which constitute the City of Požarevac. It is situated on the Danube river. The remains of the Roman capital of the province of Moesia Superior Viminacium are located near Stari Kostolac some 2 km to the east of Kostolac. Kostolac is also a center of area called Stig and home of thermal power plants and coal mines.

History
A 1.5 million year old mammoth skeleton was uncovered in the Viminacium site in June 2009.

The tribes of Autariatae and Scordisci are thought to have merged into one in this area after 313BC, since excavations show that the two groups made burials at the same exact grave field in Pecine, near Kostolac. Nine graves of Autariatae dating to 4th century BC and scattered Autariatae and Celtic graves around these earlier graves show that the two groups mixed rather than made war and this resulted in the lower Morava valley becoming a Celto-Thracio-Illyrian interaction zone. The Celtic Invasions of Greece in 279 BC formed the sub-Celtic group of Scordisci who would according to Strabo, defeat and push the powerful Triballians towards the Getae, the Scordisci self-rule in different regions of Serbia gradually ended with the Roman conquest of the Balkans in the 1st century AD.

Viminacium, a major city of the Roman province of Moesia, and the capital of Moesia Superior was situated 20 km east to the present centre, in the area of Stari Kostolac (Old Kostolac). Viminacium was the base camp of Legio VII Claudia, and hosted for some time the IV Flavia Felix. It was destroyed in 440 by the Huns, but rebuilt by Justinian I. During Maurice's Balkan campaigns, Viminacium saw destruction by the Avars and Slavs in 584 and a crushing defeat of Avar forces on the northern Danube bank in 599, destroying Avar reputation for invincibility.

Đorđe Vajfert opened coal mines in Kostolac. During World War II, Germans constructed first power plant "Mali Kostolac" ("small Kostolac"). After the war, people from everywhere came to build it.

Settlements

Aside from the town of Kostolac, the city municipality includes the following settlements:
 Klenovnik
 Ostrovo
 Petka
 Selo Kostolac

Features
 Ostrovo, the biggest island of Serbia is located near Kostolac.

Tourism

In Kostolac is the archaeological site of Viminacium, a former Roman outpost with wide streets, luxurious villas, extensive baths and an amphitheater, just recently opened to the public.

Industry

Kostolac has two thermal power plants which comprise the TPP Kostolac. These are:
 TPP "Kostolac A" – with 2 blocks – total available capacity of 310 MW and production of 716 GWh
 TPP "Kostolac B" – with 2 blocks – total available capacity of 700 MW and production of 3,027 GWh

In addition to electric power, TPP "Kostolac A" produces heating energy for heating of Kostolac and Požarevac.

Demographics
According to the 2011 census results, the municipality has a population of 13,637 inhabitants.

Ethnic groups

See also
 Municipalities of Serbia
 Cities and towns in Serbia
 Populated places of Serbia
 Viminacium
 Kostolac Airport

References

External links

 Municipality of Požarevac

Populated places in Braničevo District
Municipalities of Požarevac